Doug Elliott may refer to:

 Doug Elliott (author), American storyteller, naturalist and author
 Doug Elliott (musician) (born 1962), Canadian musician

See also
 Douglas Hemphill Elliott (1921–1960), Republican member of the U.S. House of Representatives
 Douglas Elliot (1923–2005), Scottish international rugby union player
 Doug Elliot (politician) (1917–1989), Australian politician